The Madaket Ditch, formerly spelled as Maddequet Ditch, is a canal connecting Long Pond to Madaket Harbor on the western edge of Nantucket, Massachusetts.

The ditch was first dug circa 1665 by English settlers and Native Americans as the first public works project on Nantucket. It runs roughly southwest for about 1 mile, and was cut as freshwater channels running through freshwater cattail marsh and salt marsh, in order to create more meadow and catch fish running through it in a weir. Fish runs have historically included perch, herring, smelt, and eels. In the early 20th century, a large dip net, about four feet in diameter and eight feet long, subconical in shape, was used instead of a weir to scoop up fish.

Today the ditch still exists at Second Bridge, with depths between two and four feet. As it is tidal, there is little variation in water level at the pond's end.

References 
 Every Man a King: The Story of English Settlement of Nantucket
 Tourists Guide - Down the Harbor, Hull, Nantasket and the South Shore of Massachusetts, The Old Colony Newsroom Edition, 1897, page 92.
 Madaket Harbor / Long Pond Annual Report
 A Report upon the Alewife Fisheries of Massachusetts

Canals in Massachusetts
Transportation buildings and structures in Nantucket, Massachusetts
Bodies of water of Nantucket, Massachusetts
Infrastructure completed in 1655